Apache Peak, at , is the highest peak in the Whetstone Mountains in Cochise County, Arizona. The summit, located in the Coronado National Forest, is a popular local hiking destination. It is located near the Kartchner Caverns State Park, the city of Benson, Interstate 10, and Arizona State Route 90.

Hiking
The summit of Apache Peak can be gained by a couple of different trails, which both involve moderately strenuous hikes with loose rocks, dense shrub, grass, cactus, succulents, and some small trees. Trails include the east side French Joe Canyon route and the west side Empire Ranch route.

See also
 List of mountains and hills of Arizona by height

References

Landforms of Cochise County, Arizona
Mountains of Cochise County, Arizona